Spring, Autumn and Love (French: Le printemps, l'automne et l'amour) is a 1955 French-Italian comedy drama film directed by Gilles Grangier and starring Fernandel, Nicole Berger and Andrex.

The film's sets were designed by Jacques Colombier.

Cast
 Fernandel as Fernand 'Noël' Sarrazin  
 Nicole Berger as Cécilia  
 Andrex as Blancard  
 Georges Chamarat as Bourriol  
 Denise Grey as La cliente  
 Gaston Rey as Antoine Sarrazin  
 Maria Zanoli as Anais  
 Jacqueline Noëlle as Monique  
 Mag-Avril as La première commère  
 Madeleine Sylvain as Mme. Calvette  
 Edmond Ardisson as Le facteur  
 Enrico Glori as Le maître d'hôtel  
 Julien Maffre as Le lampiste  
 René Worms as Le voyageur  
 Geo Georgey as Le boucher 
 Jenny Hélia as La cliente des négociants  
 Marthe Marty as La deuxième commère  
 Viviane Méry as La marchand de journaux  
 Manuel Gary as Victor  
 Philippe Nicaud as Jean Balestra  
 Claude Nollier as Julie Sarrazin  
 Bruce Kay as L'Américain  
 Liliane Robin as La femme de chambre  
 Fernand Sardou as Calvette  
 Jackie Sardou

References

Bibliography 
 Parish, James Robert. Film Actors Guide. Scarecrow Press, 1977.

External links 
 

1955 films
1955 comedy-drama films
French comedy-drama films
Italian comedy-drama films
1950s French-language films
Films directed by Gilles Grangier
French black-and-white films
Italian black-and-white films
1950s French films
1950s Italian films